The men's ice hockey tournament  at the 1976 Winter Olympics in Innsbruck, Austria, was the 13th Olympic Championship. The Soviet Union won its fifth gold medal. Games were held at the Olympiahalle Innsbruck.

Highlights
The main rivalry in the tournament was between the USSR and Czechoslovak national teams. The Czechoslovak team suffered from influenza throughout the tournament, and they finished the game against Poland with only twelve players on the bench. A doping test of one of the players was positive and a loss was recorded for the Czechoslovak team, although Poland did not receive points.

In the deciding game, Czechoslovakia was up 2–0 after the first period. In the second, the score was tied by Vladimir Shadrin and Vladimir Petrov. Eight minutes before the end of the game Eduard Novák scored the third goal for the Czechoslovak team. But subsequent goals by Aleksandr Yakushev and one minute later by Valeri Kharlamov led to the victory of the USSR, 4–3. The Soviet team won their fourth consecutive gold medal and fifth title overall.

Heralded as one of the great moments in German ice hockey, the West German team won a surprising bronze. After beating the Americans on the final day the German team celebrated what they believed to be a fourth place finish. While in the locker room they were informed that they had actually come third. The three-way tie was broken by first comparing the teams' head-to-head goal differential, then the remaining tied teams' goal ratio.

Sweden, having several of their top players now playing in the NHL and WHA, chose to join Canada in protesting the amateur rules and boycotted the games. They were also dissatisfied with the fact that the Soviet and Czechoslovak state-funded players who were de facto professionals were allowed to participate, meaning that Eastern Bloc countries did have an ability to send their best players, but the Western nations did not.

Medalists

First round
In the first round teams were seeded according to their placement in the 1975 World Championships.  Winners of this round qualified for Group A to play for 1st–6th places, while the losers competed in Group B for 7th–12th places. Qualifiers from East Germany and Norway chose not to play.  1975 ranking appears in parentheses.

February 2
Poland (5th) 7–4 Romania (11th)
Czechoslovakia (2nd) 14–1 Bulgaria (16th)
West Germany (8th) 5–1 Switzerland (9th)
February 3
USSR (1st) 16–3 Austria (17th)
Finland (4th) 11–2 Japan (12th)
USA (6th) 8–4 Yugoslavia (10th)

Final round

First place team wins gold, second silver and third bronze.

February 6
Czechoslovakia 2–1 Finland
West Germany 7–4 Poland
USSR 6–2 USA
February 8
Finland 5–3 West Germany
USSR 16–1 Poland
Czechoslovakia 5–0 USA
February 10
USSR 7–3 West Germany
Poland 1–0 Czechoslovakia
USA 5–4 Finland
February 12
Czechoslovakia 7–4 West Germany
USA 7–2 Poland
USSR 7–2 Finland
February 14
USSR 4–3 Czechoslovakia
Finland 7–1 Poland
West Germany 4–1 USA
Notes:

Consolation round
Teams that lost their games in the qualification round played in this group.

February 5
Yugoslavia 6–4 Switzerland
Romania 3–1 Japan
Austria 6–2 Bulgaria
February 7
Yugoslavia 4–3 Romania
Switzerland 8–3 Bulgaria
Austria 3–2 Japan
February 9
Yugoslavia 8–5 Bulgaria
Austria 3–4 Romania
Japan 6–4 Switzerland
February 11
Romania 9–4 Bulgaria
Austria 3–5 Switzerland
Japan 4–3 Yugoslavia
February 13
Romania 4–3 Switzerland
Japan 7–5 Bulgaria
Austria 3–1 Yugoslavia

Statistics

Average age
Team Bulgaria was the oldest team in the tournament, averaging 27 years and 9 months. Team USA was the youngest team in the tournament, averaging 22 years and 4 months. Gold medalists team USSR averaged 26 years and 4 months. Tournament average was 25 years and 7 months.

Leading scorers

Final ranking

References

External links
Jeux Olympiques 1976

 
1976 Winter Olympics events
1976
Olympics, Winter
1976